is a railway station on the Ōito Line in Hokujō, in the village of Hakuba, Kitaazumi District, Nagano Prefecture, Japan, operated by East Japan Railway Company (JR East).

Lines
Shinano-Moriue Station is served by the Ōito Line and is 61.6 kilometers from the starting point of the line at Matsumoto Station.

Station layout
The station consists of two ground-level opposed side platforms connected by a footbridge. The station is unattended.

Platforms

History
The station opened on 20 November 1932. With the privatization of Japanese National Railways (JNR) on 1 April 1987 the station came under the control of JR East.

Surrounding area

See also
 List of railway stations in Japan

References

External links

  

Railway stations in Nagano Prefecture
Ōito Line
Railway stations in Japan opened in 1932
Stations of East Japan Railway Company
Hakuba, Nagano